Lois Gaston (born 1937) is a former Mayor and City Councilmember for City of Duarte, California.

Biography
Gaston was born in Arkansas in 1937. She was an only child and she and her mother moved to Monrovia, California in 1949. She is a graduate of Monrovia High School.  Gaston became a member of the Duarte City Council in 2003 and was elected as the mayor on November 28, 2006. She is the first African American woman to hold the mayoral position in the city's 50-year history. In March 2009 she was named the 44th Assembly District Woman of the Year by Assemblyman Anthony Portantino. Some of her notable accomplishments are membership of the San Gabriel Valley Council of Governments and the Southern California Association of Governments, as well as serving as the State Recruitment Coordinator for AARP in California.

Gaston enjoyed a career with AT&T for 32 years before retiring in 1989 as a District Manager of Human Resources. She is a mother of four children and a grandmother of eight. of Governments, as well as serving as the State Recruitment Coordinator for AARP in California.

References

External links
Official Duarte website profile

Living people
People from Duarte, California
Mayors of places in California
Women mayors of places in California
California city council members
Women city councillors in California
1937 births
21st-century American women
African-American mayors in California